London High School is a public high school in London, Ohio.  It is the only high school in the London City Schools district.  Their nickname is the Red Raiders.

A current member of the Mid-State League's Ohio Division, London will be joining the Central Buckeye Conference in the near future, possibly as early as 2018.

Notable alumni
 David "Satch" Davidson (January 18, 1936 – August 21, 2010) was a Major League Baseball umpire in the National League from 1969 to 1984. Davidson was behind the plate for Hank Aaron's 715th home run which broke Babe Ruth's career record and he called the game in which Carlton Fisk hit a game-winning home run in game 6 of the 1975 World Series. Davidson wore uniform number 4 when the National League adopted umpire uniform numbers in 1970.
Dick LeBeau, Former NFL player and coach, member of the Pro Football Hall of Fame as a player.
 Alfred "Al" Mancini, American and UK stage, television and film actor
 Chick McGee, radio personality

References

High schools in Madison County, Ohio
London, Ohio
Public high schools in Ohio